Clanners is a Spanish children's animated short-form series aired on Televisión Española's Clan channel produced in 2011 and 2012. It debuted on 23 May 2011.

The series focuses on the fictional inhabitants of a parallel universe which are called Clanners; the first Clanner was created when a human DNA molecule merged with a quantum of electromagnetic energy inside a computer. This similarly happened with other types of DNA molecules and electronics, thus creating the Clanners and their world. The Clanners have traits of humans, animals or robots, and have a curiosity of the human world. The Clanners are divided into four tribes: Minisapiens, Biotron, Amorfix, and iTrops, but are nevertheless together. One of the Clanners, Render, is the only one that can access the human world, and will bring any object to the Clanners world that interests him and for others to learn from.

The band Maldita Nerea recorded a song titled "Bienvenido a nuestro Clan" for the show. El Chojin and La Oreja de Van Gogh also contributed to the show's first music album. India Martínez sings the song "Mi mejor regalo eres tu" included on the second album Suma y sigue.

The show won the Mejor Personaje Infantil award at the 2012 Festival El Chupete.

Characters
Render is a yellow minisapien who resembles a robot. He can access the human world. He is able to fly using his propeller, and can communicate using the human language.
eCocó is a minisapien who resembles a human girl, and wears a pink cat costume. She also speaks the human language, has a talent for music and wants to protect the environment. She's part of a trio with eComix and eCoré.
eComix is a minisapien who wears a green mouse costume. 
eCoré is a minisapien who wears a violet dog costume.
Doctor OnOff is a minisapien who is a mad scientist. He has a power symbol adorned on the container of green slime on his head. Also capable of speaking the human language, he builds machines and experiments, and wants to conquer the Clanner world, and the human world as well.
Perlita is a biotron who resembles a mollusk. She is playful and naughty.
Fredo is a biotron who resembles a pig with long ears. He is rock-fashioned and rides his own vehicles, the Fredomoto, Fredoneta, and Fredoavión.
Rey Ceviche is a biotron who is big and blue, and resembles a Mexican luchador, his head and torso are those of a fish. He bears super strength and creates art.
Capitán Memo is an amorfix who is made of green jelly and wears a red spacesuit. He wants to be a superhero despite lacking superpowers.
Débora is an amorfix who is teal, and wears a pink barrel hat. Having a voracious appetite, she transforms into a monstrous, eel-like form in order to eat.
iPé is an iTrop who resembles a humanoid robot. Also capable of flying, she is intelligent and can speak the human language.
Bit, Bip and Bop are three playful iTrops who resemble robots. Bit is yellow, Bip is green, and Bop is blue. They can also speak the human language.

References

External links
Website on Clan RTVE
Clanners on the Selecta-Vision website
Another Clanners page on the Selecta-Vision website
Clanners on Ink Apache website

2010s animated television series
2011 Spanish television series debuts
Spanish children's animated science fiction television series
Computer-animated television series
RTVE shows
Animated television series about robots